Staveley is a village and civil parish in the Harrogate district of North Yorkshire, England. In the 2001 census, the village had a population of 444, which had risen to 450 by the time of the 2011 census. In 2015, North Yorkshire County Council estimated the population to have dropped to 440.

History
The village is mentioned in the Domesday Book as belonging to Gospatric. The name Staveley is Anglo-Saxon and means the clearing where the staves were brought from.

The racehorse Staveley, winner of the 1805 St Leger Stakes, was born at nearby Boroughbridge.

The village used to have a railway station on the now disused Pilmoor, Boroughbridge and Knaresborough Railway. When it opened, it was called Staveley, but from 1881 its name was taken from nearby Copgrove village to avoid confusion with Staveley in Derbyshire.

The grade II listed, Church of All Saints, was built in 1864 and holds services twice-monthly. The church replaces an earlier structure which is believed to have existed since Medieval times.

Staveley was historically part of the West Riding of Yorkshire until 1974.

Attractions
Staveley is home to many local attractions and has the following aspects:
 Staveley Community Primary School, rated 'good' in a 2015 Ofsted inspection.
 The Royal Oak pub.
 The railway line: abandoned for several years, it is now a significant feature of the landscape to the south east of the village.
 Nature reserve: A long walk that stretches beyond Staveley. The reserve has many wild and rare species of flower and wildlife.

References

Sources

External links

Staveley & Copgrove Parish Council

Villages in North Yorkshire
Civil parishes in North Yorkshire